The  Green Bay Packers season was their 46th season overall and their 44th season in the National Football League. The team was led by sixth-year head coach Vince Lombardi, and tied for second place in the Western Conference at 8–5–1.

The Packers opened the season in Green Bay with a promising win over the rival Chicago Bears, the defending NFL champions. They then lost four of six, including three home games, and were 3–4 midway through the season, falling twice to the Baltimore Colts. The first three losses were by a total of five points, but the fourth on October 25, to the Los Angeles Rams in Milwaukee, was by ten and came after building a 17–0 lead.

In the season's latter half, Green Bay won five of six and tied the Rams in the finale to end 3½ games behind the Colts (12–2) in the West, tied for second with Minnesota. Baltimore clinched the Western title on November 22, with three games remaining. Based on point differential in the season split with the Vikings, the Packers were awarded the runner-up slot in the Playoff Bowl, the consolation third place game in Miami played three weeks after the regular season, on January 3.

Green Bay had played in the previous season's Playoff Bowl and won decisively, which followed consecutive league titles in 1961 and 1962, and three straight appearances in the championship game. In the  season's third-place game, the St. Louis Cardinals prevailed over the unmotivated Packers, 24–17.

The 1964 season was arguably the most disappointing for Lombardi as a head coach. Consecutive appearances in the consolation Playoff Bowl, and the loss, keyed Lombardi and the Packers to win three consecutive NFL titles; the latter two followed by victories in the first two Super Bowls. Since the playoff era began  in 1933, no other team was won three straight NFL titles.

For the first time since 1950, the Packers did not play on Thanksgiving Day. Green Bay next played on Thanksgiving in 1970 at the Cotton Bowl, which was the franchise's first-ever loss to the Dallas Cowboys.

Hall of Fame right guard Jerry Kramer missed most of the season due to an intestinal condition. After multiple surgeries, it was rectified in May 1965 after sizable wood fragments from a teenage accident a dozen years earlier

Offseason

NFL draft 

 Yellow indicates a future Pro Bowl selection

Roster

Regular season

Schedule 

Note: Intra-conference opponents are in bold text.

Season summary

Week 1 vs Bears

Week 2 vs Colts

Week 11: vs. Cleveland Browns

Standings

Playoff Bowl 

Source:

Awards and records 
 Bart Starr, NFL leader, passing yards, (2,144 yards)

References 

 Sportsencyclopedia.com

External links 
 PackersHistory.net  – 1964 season

Green Bay Packers seasons
Green Bay Packers
Green